Chariot of the Gods is the tenth studio album by Australian rock group Hoodoo Gurus, released on 11 March 2022. It is the first studio album by the band since Purity of Essence in 2010.

Upon announcement Dave Faulkner said:

The album was performed in its entirety for the first time via an exclusive live special event recording from Damien Gerard Studios on the NSW Central Coast on 10 March 2022.

The album's vinyl release was pushed back to 31 April due to COVID-19-related supply chain issues.

Track listing
The vinyl version features three bonus tracks: "Hung Out to Dry", the B-side of the "Get Out of Dodge" single (and a single in its own right) and covers of Bob Dylan's "Obviously Five Believers" and Lennon/McCartney's "I Wanna Be Your Man".

Personnel
Hoodoo Gurus
 Dave Faulkner – vocals, guitar, production
 Brad Shepherd – guitar
 Rick Grossman – bass guitar
 Nik Rieth – drums

Additional personnel
 Wayne Connolly – production (1–3, 5–14), engineering (all tracks)
 Leon Zervos – mastering
 Ed Stasium – mixing

Charts

References

2022 albums
Hoodoo Gurus albums